Abdullah Sultan or Abdullah bin Sultan is an Arabic name, consisting of two given names, Abdullah and Sultan, in terms of patronymic name, it means Abdullah Son of Sultan and not to be confused with Abdullah Al-Sultan (below), may refer to:
Abdulla Sultan Al Nasseri, footballer from UAE
Abdullah Ali Sultan, footballer from UAE
 Abdullah Sultan, swimmer for UAE
Abdullah Al-Sultan is an Arabic name which consists of the surname Al-Sultan and the given name, literally Abdullah, descendant of Sultan.
none